Morges railway station is a railway station in the municipality of Morges, in the Swiss canton of Vaud. It is an intermediate stop on the standard gauge Lausanne–Geneva line of Swiss Federal Railways and the eastern terminus of the  gauge Bière–Apples–Morges line of Transports de la région Morges-Bière-Cossonay (MBC).

Layout and connections 
Morges has two island platforms and a side platform serving five passenger tracks. The  gauge trains of the Transports de la région Morges-Bière-Cossonay (MBC) use track  5, on the north side of the station; the standard gauge trains of Swiss Federal Railways use the other four tracks. MBC also operates bus services from the station.

Services 
 the following services stop at Morges:

On weekends, hourly service to Geneva Airport.

References

External links 
 
 

Railway stations in the canton of Vaud
Swiss Federal Railways stations